A biophysical profile (BPP) is a prenatal ultrasound evaluation of fetal well-being involving a scoring system, with the score being termed Manning's score. It is often done when a non-stress test (NST) is non reactive, or for other obstetrical indications.

The "modified biophysical profile" consists of the NST and amniotic fluid index only.

Procedure
The BPP has 5 components: 4 ultrasound (US) assessments and an NST. The NST evaluates fetal heart rate and response to fetal movement. The five discrete biophysical variables:

 Fetal heart rate
 Fetal breathing
 Fetal movement
 Fetal tone
 Amniotic fluid volume

Use of vibroacoustic stimulation to accelerate evaluation has been described.

Interpretation
Each assessment is graded either 0 or 2 points, and then added up to yield a number between 0 and 10.  A BPP of 8 or 10 is generally considered reassuring.  A BPP normally is not performed before the second half of a pregnancy, since fetal movements do not occur in the first half .
The presence of these biophysical variables implies absence of significant central nervous system hypoxemia/acidemia at the time of testing. By comparison, a compromised fetus typically exhibits loss of accelerations of the fetal heart rate (FHR), decreased body movement and breathing, hypotonia, and, less acutely, decreased amniotic fluid volume.

See also 
 Nonstress test
 Cardiotocography

References

Tests during pregnancy